Jason Dixon (born April 4, 1973) is a former American professional basketball player.

Dixon played with teams in Turkey, Israel, Argentina, Sweden and Cyprus after his departure from Liberty in 1995. In 1998, he joined the Guangdong Southern Tigers, and was a member of their team which won five CBA league championships between 2004 and 2009. Following the conclusion of their championship 2009 season, Dixon retired from the Chinese Basketball Association (CBA). He would then play for the Philippine Patriots and the Thailand Tigers before retiring from basketball altogether.

On December 23, 2009, the Southern Tigers held a ceremony at Tigers Arena to retire his #15 jersey in honour of his contributions to the team. Dixon is only the second CBA player to have his jersey retired, with the first being Yao Ming. He was also the only international player to have their number retired for any team in the CBA before Tracy McGrady had his number retired by the Qingdao DoubleStar Eagles in 2014.

References

1973 births
Living people
American expatriate basketball people in China
American expatriate basketball people in the Philippines
American expatriate basketball people in Thailand
American men's basketball players
Basketball players from Denver
Centers (basketball)
Guangdong Southern Tigers players
Junior college men's basketball players in the United States
Liberty Flames basketball players
Philippine Basketball Association imports
Powerade Tigers players